Sean Frank Hunt (born 7 December 2001) is an English professional cricketer who plays for Sussex. Hunt is a right-handed batsman and a left-arm fast-medium bowler.

Hunt played his junior cricket at Horsley and Send Cricket Club in Surrey. Developing his skills through the youth and adult teams, he later moved to Ashtead Cricket Club in 2020.

From Guildford, Hunt was Surrey's academy player of the year in 2019. Hunt switched to Sussex from Surrey in January 2021 and spent time in the winter in Australia with the Darren Lehmann Cricket Academy in Adelaide and playing grade cricket for West Torrens CC.

He made his first-class debut on 8 April 2021, the opening day of the 2021 County Championship as Sussex played Lancashire at Old Trafford.

References

External links

2001 births
Living people
English cricketers
Sussex cricketers
Sportspeople from Guildford